Ozornovo is a rural locality (a village) in Denyatinskoye Rural Settlement, Melenkovsky District, Vladimir Oblast, Russia. The population was 16 as of 2010.

Geography 
Ozornovo is located 28 km north of Melenki (the district's administrative centre) by road. Boytsevo is the nearest rural locality.

References 

Rural localities in Melenkovsky District